Renny Wilson is a Canadian pop singer-songwriter, record producer, recording engineer, and director. He has recorded as a solo artist, performed as a member of The Subatomics, and as a member of other bands such as Michael Rault, Faith Healer and Brazilian Money.

History 
In 2012, Renny Wilson self-released his debut solo album Sugarglider. In November 2012, he was signed to Mint Records, who re-released the album on January 22, 2013. Beatroute said of the re-release, "the whole album is stuffed full of lush synth layers and endless saxophone riffs which have the album reeking of 1980s cheese in the best possible way," and noted the performer's "self-deprecating geeky style." Around the time of the re-release of Sugarglider, Wilson reported he was working on a follow-up to his debut with the working title "Goddess Fear."

In June 2014, he self-released a genre shifting mini-album entitled Punk Explosion on cassette. An extended LP version of this album entitled Punk Explosion/ Extension was released on the Mint Records label on July 10, 2015. He said at the time, "Aside from the years and the time it took to release it, Punk Explosion took almost no time compared to that Sugarglider record. I spent like no time mixing it, I spent no time mastering it, and that's probably why it sounds so terrible."

In October 2022, his directorial debut was released, a music video for Faith Healer's "Another Fool".

Discography

Albums 

 Sugarglider (Mint Records, 2012/2013)
 Pink Explosion (Value Records, 2014)
 Pink Explosion/ Extension (Mint Records, 2015)

Production credits 

 Brother Loyola by Jessica Jalbert (Old Ugly Recording Co, 2011)
 Cosmic Troubles by Faith Healer (Mint Records, 2015)
 Familiar Touch by DIANA (Culvert Music, 2016)
 Best Wishes by Baby Jey (Cutey Music Group, 2017)
 Try ;-) by Faith Healer (Mint Records, 2017)
 Baby Only You & I by Anemone (Luminelle, 2018)

References

External links
 Renny Wilson at Bandcamp
 Mint Records

Canadian male singers
Canadian singer-songwriters
Living people
Year of birth missing (living people)
Musicians from Edmonton
Mint Records artists
Canadian male singer-songwriters